Indigenous music is a term for the traditional music of the indigenous peoples of the world, that is, the music of an "original" ethnic group that inhabits any geographic region alongside more recent immigrants who may be greater in number. The term therefore depends upon the political role an ethnic group plays rather than upon its strictly musical characteristics, for all further criteria (territory, race, history, subsistence lifestyle, etc.) defining indigenous peoples can also be applied to majority cultures.

Societies defined as, or defining themselves as, "indigenous" are found in every inhabited climate zone and continent of the world. Some important articles are:

Music of Africa, especially the non-European, Asian or Arab-derived traditions
Maori music of New Zealand
Music of the Aborigines and Torres Strait Islanders of Australia
Music of the indigenous peoples of Latin America and the Caribbean 
Native American music of the United States and Inuit, Métis and  First Nation music of Canada 
Sámi music of Norway, Sweden, Finland, and Russia
Music of South India
Music of the republics of Russia

References

See also

 
Traditional music